For chromosome 20, R-spondin 4 is a protein in humans that is encoded by the RSPO4 gene.

This gene encodes a member of the R-spondin family of proteins that share a common domain organization consisting of a signal peptide, cysteine-rich/furin-like domain, thrombospondin domain and a C-terminal basic region. The encoded protein may be involved in activation of Wnt/beta-catenin signaling pathways. Mutations in this gene are associated with anonychia congenita. Alternate splicing results in multiple transcript variants.[provided by RefSeq, Sep 2009].

References

Further reading 

Genes on human chromosome 20
Glycoproteins
Extracellular matrix proteins